Ringebu or Vålebru is the administrative centre of Ringebu Municipality in Innlandet county, Norway. The village is located in the Gudbrandsdal valley, along the Gudbrandsdalslågen river. The European route E6 highway and the Dovrebanen railway line both pass through the village.

Name
The village is named Ringebu which is the same as the name of the municipality in which it is located. The name Vålebru is another name for the village which is most often used when one wants to avoid ambiguity between the village of Ringebu and the municipality of Ringebu. The name Vålebru comes from the local river Våla, which flows through the village, and the bridge that was laid over the river here.

References

Ringebu
Villages in Innlandet
Populated places on the Gudbrandsdalslågen